Tadeusz Władysław Kilanowicz (8 June 1940 – 4 July 1979) was a Polish ice hockey player. He played for Podhale Nowy Targ during his career, winning the Polish league championship in 1966 and 1969. He also played for the Polish national team at the 1964 Winter Olympics, and multiple World Championships.

References

External links
 

1940 births
1979 deaths
Ice hockey players at the 1964 Winter Olympics
Olympic ice hockey players of Poland
People from Nowy Targ
Podhale Nowy Targ players
Polish ice hockey forwards
Sportspeople from Lesser Poland Voivodeship